Junior Paulo (born 8 September 1983) is a former United States international rugby league footballer who played as a  and  forward for the Parramatta Eels in the NRL.

Background
Paulo was born in Auckland, New Zealand. He is of American Samoan descent. He is an Australian Schoolboys rugby league international.

Playing career
After spending time in the semi-professional and professional reserve grade competitions in New South Wales, Paulo signed with the Parramatta Eels in the National Rugby League (NRL) for the 2007 season.  He made his first grade debut for Parramatta in round 10 of the 2007 NRL season against North Queensland which ended in a 44–14 victory at Parramatta Stadium.

In the same year, he played in Parramatta's reserve grade premiership winning team as they defeated North Sydney 20–15 at Telstra Stadium.

He was named to the Samoa training squad for the 2008 Rugby League World Cup, He signed with the St George Illawarra Dragons for the 2010 NRL season, and with the Penrith Panthers for the 2011 NRL season. In 2011 he was named in the United States national team for the 2013 Rugby League World Cup Qualifiers.

Controversy
In December 2017 Paulo was arrested and, together with fellow former Eels player Royce Hura, faced Waverley Local Court on five charges.  These included the possession of two unauthorised semi-automatic pistols, $649,990 in cash alleged to have been the proceeds of crime and participating in a criminal group.

On 10 August 2020, Paulo was sentenced to 17 years in jail after attempting to supply near one tonne of Cocaine into Sydney.

References

1983 births
Living people
New Zealand criminals
New Zealand people of American Samoan descent
New Zealand people of Niuean descent
New Zealand rugby league players
Parramatta Eels players
Rugby league players from Auckland
Rugby league props
Rugby league second-rows
Shellharbour City Dragons players
United States national rugby league team players
Wentworthville Magpies players
Windsor Wolves players